This is a list of Maldivian films released in 2001.

Releases

Feature film

Short Film

Television

See also
 Lists of Maldivian films

Explanatory notes

References 

Maldivian
2001